Brendan John Mullin (born Jerusalem, 31 October 1963) is a former Ireland international rugby union football player. He played as a centre.

Profile

Mullin spent his early life in Jerusalem, Israel and attended secondary school in Blackrock College, Dublin. A Leinster and Ireland schoolboy international, Mullin studied law at Trinity College Dublin and also earned Rugby blues whilst studying at Oxford University.

Mullin was a noted hurdler, winning the All-Ireland Schools senior boys’ hurdles in 1981 and 1982 and with a personal best of 14.41 seconds for the 110m hurdles.

Rugby career

Mullin had 55 caps for Ireland, scoring 17 tries and 1 conversion, 72 points in aggregate. His debut was at the 16–9 loss to Australia, on 10 November 1984, in Dublin, and his final cap was at the 36–12 loss against France, on 10 June 1995, at the 1995 Rugby World Cup, in Durban, South Africa.

Mullin played at three Rugby World Cup finals, in 1987, 1991 and 1995.
He played in 9 Five Nations championships: 1985, 1986, 1987, 1988, 1989, 1990, 1991, 1992 and 1995.

He toured Australia in 1989 with the British and Irish Lions and at the time played club rugby for Blackrock College RFC.

Mullin also played 3 times for the Barbarians in the 1980s.

Alleged criminal activity
Mullin was arrested in Dublin on 21 September 2021, and brought before the Dublin District Court on the same day on foot of an investigation by the Garda National Economic Crime Bureau. He was charged with nine counts of theft under the Theft and Fraud Offences Act, accusing him of stealing €578,000 from Bank of Ireland between 2011 and 2013. He was also accused of deceiving two people to sign a payment instruction to make a gain for himself or causing a loss to another, and with five counts of false accounting.

He made no comment when informed of the charges. He was released on bail of his own bond of €10,000 (£8,584) and agreed to surrender his passport.

At an appearance before the Dublin Circuit Criminal Court on 17 February 2022, a trial date was set for 7 May 2024. The case is expected to take three weeks.

References

1963 births
Living people
Irish rugby union players
Ireland international rugby union players
British & Irish Lions rugby union players from Ireland
Leinster Rugby players
London Irish players
Blackrock College RFC players
Rugby union centres
Sportspeople from Jerusalem
People educated at Blackrock College
Irish expatriates in Israel
Alumni of the University of Oxford
Alumni of Trinity College Dublin
Dublin University Football Club players
Irish expatriate rugby union players
Expatriate rugby union players in England
Rugby union players from County Dublin
Irish expatriate sportspeople in England
Oxford University RFC players
Bank of Ireland people